The siege of Schoonhoven of 1575, also known as the capture of Schoonhoven, was a Spanish victory that took place between 11 and 24 August 1575, at Schoonhoven, Spanish Netherlands (present-day South Holland, the Netherlands), during the Eighty Years' War and the Anglo-Spanish War (1585–1604). On June 28, 1575, the Spanish forces, between 8,000 and 10,000 soldiers, led by Gilles de Berlaymont, Lord of Hierges, and Stadtholder of Guelders, Holland, Zeeland and Utrecht, captured Buren, and on August 7, Oudewater. The Spanish commander continued its successful progress and arrived at Schoonhoven on August 11. After 13 days of siege, and a courageous but futile resistance, the rebel forces led by De La Garde, composed by Dutch, English, Scottish, French and Walloon soldiers (about 800 men), surrendered to the more experienced Spanish troops, on August 24. The population of the town, that were unwilling to help the rebel forces, received Berlaymont with great joy.

Two weeks later, the Spanish forces under Charles de Brimeu, Count of Megen, marched towards Woerden, and laid siege to the town on September 8.

See also
 Siege of Zierikzee (1576)
 Siege of Maastricht (1579)
 List of Stadtholders of the Low Countries

Notes

References
 C. Duffy. Siege Warfare: The Fortress in the Early Modern World 1494-1660. Volumen 1. London. 
 Van Gelderen, Martin. The Ducht Revolt. Cambridge University Press 1933. United Kingdom. 
 Van Nimwegen, Olaf. The Dutch Army and the Military Revolutions 1588-1688. First published 2010. The Boydell Press, Woodbridge. 
 Tracy, J.D. (2008). The Founding of the Dutch Republic: War, Finance, and Politics in Holland 1572–1588. Oxford University Press. 
 Van Nierop, Henk. Treason in the Northern Quarter: War, Terror, and the Rule of Law in the Dutch Revolt. First published in 1999. Holland.

External links
 The Capture of Schoonhoven

Sieges of the Eighty Years' War
Schoonhoven
Schoonhoven
Schoonhoven
1575 in Europe
Conflicts in 1575
16th-century military history of the Kingdom of England
History of South Holland
Krimpenerwaard